Raúl Ramírez (born 1953) is a retired Mexican professional tennis player.

Raúl Ramírez may also refer to:

Raúl Ramírez (actor) (1927–2014), Mexican actor
Raul Ramirez (journalist) (1946–2013), Cuban American journalist
Raul Anthony Ramirez (born 1944), former United States federal judge
Raúl Zerimar Ramírez (born 1994), Mexican footballer
Raúl Gómez Ramírez (1964–2014), Mexican politician